The discography of Young Divas, an Australian pop girl group, consists of two studio albums, one compilation album, four singles, two album appearances and four music videos. The group was formed in 2006 by Sony BMG Australia which included previous Australian Idol contestants Ricki-Lee Coulter, Paulini, Kate DeAraugo and Emily Williams. Young Divas released their self-titled debut album in November 2006, which debuted at number four on the ARIA Albums Chart and was certified double platinum by the Australian Recording Industry Association (ARIA), for shipments of 140,000 copies. A cover of Donna Summer's "This Time I Know It's for Real" was released as the album's lead single and peaked at number two on the ARIA Singles Chart. The song was certified platinum by the ARIA, for shipments of 70,000 copies. The second single was a cover of Lonnie Gordon's "Happenin' All Over Again", which peaked at number nine and was certified gold for shipments of 35,000 copies. A cover of Hazell Dean's "Searchin'" was released as the third and final single from the album, and peaked at number 40.

In June 2007, Coulter left the group to resume her solo music career and was replaced by Jessica Mauboy. Young Divas released their second studio album New Attitude in November 2007, which debuted at number 10 on the ARIA Albums Chart and was certified gold. A cover of Loverboy's "Turn Me Loose" was released as the lead single and featured New Zealand rapper Savage. The song peaked at number 15 on the ARIA Singles Chart. In 2008, the group officially disbanded with all members resuming their solo music careers.

Albums

Studio albums

Compilation albums

Singles

Album appearances

Music videos

Notes

References

Pop music group discographies
Discographies of Australian artists